Lieutenant Grant Russell Williams (July 29, 1930 – April 26, 1964) was a U. S. Navy test pilot, of Webster Groves, Missouri.  He was best known for diverting his crashing plane away from populated areas in Jacksonville, Florida, in April, 1964.
Williams died in the crash; he was survived by his wife Kathleen and his four preschool children.

Williams had eight sisters, including Margaret W. Asprey, and including one who died in early childhood.

References

1930 births
1964 deaths
People from Webster Groves, Missouri
Aviators killed in aviation accidents or incidents in the United States
United States Naval Aviators